Kantonsschule Zürich Nord (KZN) is a Swiss cantonal gymnasium (Langzeit-, Kurzzeit, und Fachmittelschule) in Oerlikon, northern Zürich, Switzerland. The school, which first opened in 2012, was formed by the merger of Kantonsschule Zürich Birch and Kantonsschule Oerlikon (see German WP).

References

External links
  Kantonsschule Zürich Nord

Upper secondary schools in the Canton of Zürich
2012 establishments in Switzerland
Educational institutions established in 2012
Schools in Zürich